The 2013–14 Liga Panameña de Fútbol season was the 25th season of top-flight football in Panama. The season began on 20 July 2013 and was scheduled to end in May 2014. Ten teams competed throughout the entire season.

Teams
Atlético Chiriquí finished in 10th place in the overall table last season and were relegated to the Liga Nacional de Ascenso. Taking their place for this season are the overall champions of last season's Liga Nacional de Ascenso Independiente F.C.

2013 Apertura

Standings

Results

Semifinals

First leg

Second leg

Final

List of foreign players in the league
This is a list of foreign players in Apertura 2013. The following players:
have played at least one apertura game for the respective club.
have not been capped for the Panama national football team on any level, independently from the birthplace

Alianza 
  Juan Osorio
  Victor Sanchez
  Eder Nilson
  victor Isaza
  Diego Medina
  Juan Ospina

Arabe Unido
  David Leon
  Bryan Flores
  Jonathan Chavera
  Miguel Lloyd
  Erick Ozuna
  Mauro Aguilar

Chepo
  Gianni Baggini
  David Perez
  Alexander Moreno
  Manuel Bocanegra
  Anderson Diaz

Chorillo
  Pedro Reyna
  Caio Jose Milan
  Miguel Duque
  Justin Arboleda

Plaza Amador
  Jean Palacios

 (player released mid season)

Independiente
  Mauricio Munoz
  Luis Martinez
  Carlos Lopez Sierra
  Luis Fernando Escobar

Rio Abajo
  Jhuanne Gonzales
  Juan Banguera 
  Carlos Alberto Cordoba
  Freddy Isaza
  Jose Gonzales
  Darwin Mena
  Luis Rojas
  Stewar Figueroa

San Francisco FC
  William Negrete
  Edinson Eduardo Villalba
  Yezid Zapata

Sporting San Miguelito
   Julian Campos
   Nicolas Ortega
   Jackson Valoy
   Pablo Andres Ochoa

Tauro FC
  Pablo Gabriel Gallardo
  Jorge Lenis
  Reneil Herrera
  Nilson Castañeda
  Enrique Perez
  Julian Agressot

2014 Clausura

Team information
Last updated: June 28, 2013

Personnel and sponsoring (2014 Clausura)

Standings

Results

Semifinals

First leg

Second leg

Final

List of foreign players in the league
This is a list of foreign players in Clausura 2014. The following players:
have played at least one apertura game for the respective club.
have not been capped for the Panama national football team on any level, independently from the birthplace .

Alianza 
  Facundo Crock (Reserves)
  Eder Nilson Paredez
  Christian Mesa 
  Juan Pablo Cifuentes

Arabe Unido
  Jhon Ramírez Pombo
  Jorge Quintero
  Miguel Lloyd

Chepo
 None

Chorillo
  Yustin Buenaños
  Mario Hernández 
  Ricardo Jiménez

Plaza Amador
  Ariel Bonilla
  Julio Castillo

 (player released mid season)

Independiente
  Mauricio Munoz
  Carlos Lopez Sierra
  Luis Fernando Escobar

Rio Abajo
  Johnatan Mosquera 
  Davison Atehortua
  Jose Gonzales
  Lucas Arias

San Francisco FC
  William Negrete
  Edinson Eduardo Villalba
  José Aquino Allende

Sporting San Miguelito
 None

Tauro Fc
  Reneil Herrera
  Jan Bryan Contreras 
  Axel Villanueva

External links
 https://int.soccerway.com/national/panama/lpf/20132014/apertura/r21535/
 http://panamafutbol.com/?cat=3
 http://somoslasele.com/

Liga Panameña de Fútbol seasons
1
Pan